Tanzanian draughts (or simply TZ draughts; and drafti in Swahili) is a variant of draughts (checkers) board game played usually in Tanzania. This is the strategy game that is played by two people using pieces on board. The game is very similar to Czech draughts but in this type the player can capture using king or men, there is no priority for that. Apart from that they are completely similar in any way. The game is also somehow similar to American checkers and Shashki in case of starting position. So Tanzanian draughts can be simply explained as "American checkers with flying king". King flies and captures the same like in Czech draughts (or Russian draughts) does. Like many other kinds of draughts, there is possibility that either player can win the game or draw can be offered but this is based on the negotiations of players or supporters of the game.

Examples of famous TZ draughts opening moves (locally called "copies") are:

Samba
Sumu ya pandu
Mabano
Goma la kizee
Pasati
Kata mara mbili
Mbuzi kavimba
Tege
Bana Mbavu
Chotara
Box

Rules

The game is played on 8×8 board with squares alternating in colors. The empty corner is on the right side of player. Any one can start the game depending on the decisions of players. The following are rules which are compulsory during gameplay in Tanzanian checkers:

Similarities and differences with Russian draughts 

 Similarities
 Board size, orientation and starting position are the same
 Men moves forwards only
 King can fly in any direction 
 Capturing is mandatory
 Differences

Widely accepted laws
While there are currently no notable federations or institutions that standardize rules or laws of Tanzanian checkers, the following laws are accepted countrywide. Most famous, best players in Tanzania follow these conventions. Many of these are already explained in previous sections.
For the first time (match), any one can start the game.
Valid move must be done once, player cannot undo valid move.
The game is draw when each play has one king or two kings with no other pieces.
The game is not draw if one player has three kings and at least one of his or her king is in main diagonal, and another player has one king.
If the above situation occurs, player with single king has to count each of her moves up to 12, if number of counts reach 12 without win, the game is draw.
If one of players has three pieces, two are kings and one is not king but main diagonal is under control of him or her, and if another player has only one piece which is king then a player with one king can decide to promote all three pieces of his opponent as kings and start counting (as explained in previous law).
Player who wins the match must start next match. If draw, the next match must be started by player who has not started this draw match.
Full competition consists of two matches if one player won all two matches. However there are additional match called limboti if the first two matches are not all won by single player. In short this offer is possible with the following outcomes of two matches: 0-0, 1-0, 0-1, 1-1 but not 2-0 or 0-2.
If there are more than three people to participate in checkers tournament, then the tournament type must be knockout. The player who is eliminated is the one who loses full competition. So the player who won many competitions is regarded as best player of the tournament. The main points of tournament of player is number of opponents eliminated by him or her in all competitions in tournament.

Optional rules
The following rules are based on negotiations and agreement of players or teams. Not all players obey these rules in TZ draughts gameplay. Therefore they are not necessary.
 one has three kings and one has only one king, players have to count each move of player who has one king (or sometimes one who has three kings but not both). If number of moves is (usually) 12 depending upon what the players agreed, the draw will be offered. The reason of this agreement is that, it could take long time to end match because the chance of winning is small, though a player with three kings can (if plays perfectly) still win if the main diagonal is under the control of him or her.
If one has won the game without any player having the king during the game play, the goal to winner is called "supa" (pronounced as the word SUPER) and the one goal is equal to 12 goals.
The one who wins the game should start the next game. 
After each game no matter whether draw or won, players must exchange their pieces.

See also
Draughts
World Checkers/Draughts Championship
Bao

References

Draughts variants